This is the discography of British DJ and producer Seamus Haji.

Singles
As Seamus Haji
1996 "Big Bang Theory"
2004 "Last Night a DJ Saved My Life" #69 UK
2004 "Freaky" (With ATFC)
2004 "Ooh Ooh Ah!" (With ATFC)
2005 "Angels Of Love"
2005 "Changes" (With Def-E)
2005 "Weekend" (With Paul Emanuel)
2005 "Take Me Away" (With Paul Emanuel) #20 Finland; #73 UK
2006 "Devotion (A Bit More Lovin')" (With Timmy Vegas)
2006 "Happy" (With Steve Mac)
2007 "Last Night a DJ Saved My Life" (re-release) (featuring KayJay) - #6 Finland, #13 UK
2007 "If" - (With Paul Emanuel featuring Robert Owens)
2008 "Head To Toe" (featuring Doug Lazy)
2008 "24 Hours (Nice Tight Derriere)" (With Lords Of Flatbush)
2009 "The Pressure" (With Paul Emanuel featuring Beverly Knight & Bryan Chambers)
2009 "I've Been Looking" (With Romain Curtis)
2009 "Speaker" (With ATFC featuring K.C Flightt)
2009 "In The Moment" (With Paul Emanuel featuring Roachford)
2009 "My Destiny" (With Dino Psaras)
2010 "So Far Away" (With Kaskade)
2010 "Good Times" (With Funkagenda & Mark Knight)
2010 "Just A Friend" (With Romain Curtis)
2017 "Right Track" (with ATFC)
2018 "Disco Crown" (with Sammy Deuce)
2018 "Celebrate Disco" (with Sammy Deuce)
2018 "Give You Love"

Allusion 
2017 "Way Back"

Big Bang Theory
1997 "Stepping"
When U Touch Me" (featuring Carolyn Harding)
1998 "All Nite EP"
1998 "All Nite EP Vol.2"
2001 "God's Child/Oh Yeah"
2002 "God's Child" (Re-release) - #51 UK Singles Chart
2003 "Do U Got Funk?" (featuring Derek Conyer)
2003 "Haven't Been Funked Enough"

Mekkah
2001 "I Got You" (featuring Bryan Chambers)
2002 "Race Of Survival" (featuring Stephen Granville)
2003 "Found A Love" (featuring Bryan Chambers)
2003 "Dimensions (I'm Happy)" (featuring Stephen Granville)

Get This!
2003 "Ya Underwear"
2003 "Work That Sucka"
2004 "Party People"

11th Dimension
2002 "Beat Goes On" (With Paul Emanuel)
2003 "The Force" (With Paul Emanuel)
2004 "The Rhythm" (With Paul Emanuel)

Heart & Soul
2003 "Share Your Love" (featuring Tommy Blaize)

Sonz Of Soul
1995 "Race Of Survival" (With Steve McCucheon)

Ijah
2004 "Love The Way U Move"
2007 "Nitelife" (featuring D'empress)

Undercover Lover
2009 "Who's Been Sleeping In My Bed?"

Remixes
1993:
Lisa Stansfield - "Little Bit of Heaven"

2003:
Scape feat D'empress - "Be My Friend" Big Love

2005:
Asle - "Golden Sun" (Seamus Haji & Paul Emmanuel Remix) - CR2
Axwell featuring Tara McDonald - "Feel The Vibe (Til The Morning Comes)" (Seamus Haji Big Love Remix) - Data
Dannii Minogue featuring The Soul Seekerz - "Perfection" (Seamus Haji & Paul Emmanuel remix)
Late Night Alumni - "Empty Streets" (Haji & Emanuel Remix) - Hed Kandi

2006:
Sugababes - "Easy" (Haji & Emanuel Remix) - Island
Blu-ray featuring Jimmy Somerville - "You & Me" (Seamus Haji & Paul Emanuel Remix) - All Around The World
Bon Garcon - Freak You (Seamus Haji & Paul Emanuel TD Edit)
Booty Luv - "Boogie 2Nite" (Seamus Haji Remix) - Hed Kandi
Chanel - "My Life" (Seamus Haji Remix) - Hed Kandi
Route 33 featuring Alex James - "Looking Back" (Seamus Haji & Paul Emanuel Remix) - Apollo/Universal

2007:
Booty Luv - "Don't Mess with My Man" (Seamus Haji Big Love Remix) - Hed Kandi
Calvin Harris - "Colours" (Seamus Haji Big Love Remix) - Columbia
Ijah featuring D'Empress - "Nitelife" (Seamus Haji Big Love Remix) - Big Love Music
J. Holiday - "Bed" (Seamus Haji Remix)
Just Jack - "Writer's Block" (Seamus Haji Big Love Remix) - Mercury
Mr Hudson & The Library - "Picture Of You" (Seamus Haji Remix) - Mercury
Rihanna featuring Jay-Z - "Umbrella" (Seamus Haji & Paul Emanuel Remix) - Universal
Róisín Murphy - "Overpowered" (Seamus Haji Remix) - EMI
Stonebridge - "SOS" (Seamus Haji Remix) - Apollo/Stoney Boy
One Night Only - "Just For Tonight" (Seamus Haji Remix)
Orson - "Aint No Party" (Seamus Haji Remix) Mercury
Brand New Heavies - "I Don't Know Why (I Love You)"
DJ Pierre - "Destroy This Track" (Seamus Haji Remix) Big Love
Mish Mash - "Speechless" - (Seamus Haji Remix) Data
Paul Harris - "Find A Friend" (Seamus Haji Remix) Toolroom

2008:
Mariah Carey - "Touch My Body" (Seamus Haji & Paul Emanuel Remix) - Universal
Moby - "I Love To Move In Here" (Seamus Haji Big Love Remix) - Mute
Rihanna - "Take a Bow" (Seamus Haji & Paul Emanuel Remix)
One Night Only - "Just For Tonight" (Seamus Haji Remix) - Mercury
Teamsters featuring Tara McDonald - "Shake It Off" (Seamus Haji Big Love Remix) - Positiva
The Ting Tings - "Shut Up and Let Me Go" (Haji & Emanuel Remix) - Columbia
Shakedown - "At Night" (Seamus Haji Remix)
Brandy - "Right Here (Departed)" - (Seamus Haji & Paul Emanuel Remix)
Robyn - "Who's That Girl" - (Seamus Haji Remix) Positiva
Paul Harris & Cevin Fisher - "Deliver Me" Big Love

2009:
Brandy - Right Here (Departed) (Seamus Haji & Paul Emanuel Club Mix)
Craig David - "Insomnia" (Haji & Emanuel Remix)
The-Dream featuring Kanye West - "Walkin' On the Moon" (Seamus Haji & Paul Emanuel Club Mix)
Utada - "Come Back to Me" (Seamus Haji & Paul Emanuel Remix) - 	Island Def Jam
Mariah Carey - "Obsessed" (Seamus Haji & Paul Emanuel Remix)
Carolina Liar - "Show Me What I'm Looking For" (Seamus Haji & Paul Emanuel Club Remix)
Huggy & Dean Newton Feat Sam Obernik - "Get Lifted" (Seamus Haji Vocal Edit)
Mika - "Rain" (Seamus Haji Big Love Remix)
Sneaky Sound System - "It's Not My Problem" (Seamus Haji Remix)
One Eskimo - "Hometime" (Seamus Haji Remix)
Mimo - "Will You Be There" (Seamus Haji Remix) Mute
Simply Red - "Money's Too Tight To Mention" (Seamus Haji & Paul Emanuel Remix)

2010:
Craig David - "One More Lie (Standing In The Shadows)" (Seamus Haji & Paul Emanuel Remix)
Estelle - "Fall In Love" (Seamus Haji Remix)
Jamiroquai - "White Knuckle Ride" (Seamus Haji Remix) - Mercury
Loick Essiene - "Love Drunk" (Seamus Haji & Paul Emanuel Remix)
EmIi - "Mr Romeo" (Seamus Haji Remix) - EMI
Tiffany Dunn - "Shut The Front Door (Got My Girls)"
The Big Bang Club - "Chemistry" (Seamus Haji Remix)
Kaci Battaglia - "Crazy Possessive" (Seamus Haji Extended Mix & Radio Edit) - Curb

2011:
Hurts - "Sunday"(Seamus Haji Club Mix & Radio Edit)
Grace - "When The lights Go Down" (Seamus Haji Remix)  Dream Merchant 21
Dionne Bromfield - "Foolin'" (Seamus Haji Remix) - Universal
Tatiana Okupnik- "Been A Fool" (Seamus Haji Remix) - Island
Avi Elman and Danny J feat Nuwella - "Whats The Point" (Seamus Haji Remix)
Donae'O - "I" (Seamus Haji Soul Love Mix)
Jessie J - "Who You Are" (Seamus Haji Radio Mix)

2012:
Carly Rae Jepsen - "This Kiss" (Seamus Haji Remix)
Niki & The Dove - "DJ Ease My Mind" (Seamus Haji Remix)
 Maroon 5 – "One More Night" (Seamus Haji Remix)
Rebecca Ferguson - "Too Good To Lose" (Seamus Haji Remix)
Rita Ora featuring Tinie Tempah - "R.I.P" (Seamus Haji Remix)
Scissor Sisters - "Shady Love" (Seamus Haji Dub Remix)
Scissor Sisters - "F***" (Seamus Haji Remix)
Jodie Connor featuring Busta Rhymes - "Take You There" (Seamus Haji Radio Edit)
Jodie Connor featuring Busta Rhymes - "Take You There" (Seamus Haji Mix)
Ke$ha - "Die Young" (Seamus Haji Radio Edit)
Ke$ha - "Die Young" (Seamus Haji Extended Mix)
Elton John vs. Pnau - "Sad" (Seamus Haji Remix)

2013:
Amelia Lily - "Party Over" (Seamus Haji Club Mix)

2014:
Paul Morrell Ft Mutya Buena - "Give Me Love" (Seamus Haji Club Mix)

2016:
Somn3um - Never (Seamus Haji Remix)

References

Discographies of British artists
House music discographies